Raveen Yasas (born 10 January 1999) is a Sri Lankan cricketer. He made his first-class debut for Chilaw Marians Cricket Club in the 2016–17 Premier League Tournament on 20 January 2017. He made his List A debut for Puttalam District in the 2016–17 Districts One Day Tournament on 22 March 2017. He made his Twenty20 debut on 4 March 2021, for Chilaw Marians Cricket Club in the 2020–21 SLC Twenty20 Tournament.

References

External links
 

1999 births
Living people
Sri Lankan cricketers
Chilaw Marians Cricket Club cricketers
Puttalam District cricketers